Dulab-e Shirin (also Romanized as Dūlāb-e Shīrīn; also known as Dūlābshīrīn) is a village in Tayebi-ye Sarhadi-ye Gharbi Rural District, Charusa District, Kohgiluyeh County, Kohgiluyeh and Boyer-Ahmad Province, Iran. At the 2006 census, its population was 122, in 24 families.

References 

Populated places in Kohgiluyeh County